Enguterothrix is a genus of dwarf spiders that was first described by J. Denis in 1962.  it contains only two species: E. crinipes and E. simpulum.

See also
 List of Linyphiidae species (A–H)

References

Araneomorphae genera
Linyphiidae
Spiders of Africa
Spiders of Asia